The Unknown Quantity is a mystery novel by Mignon G. Eberhart published by Random House in 1953 and was issued in the UK by Collins Crime Club that same year. It was reprinted in 1990 by Warner Books.

External links
The Unknown Quantity at Kirkus Reviews
The Unknown Quantity at Goodreads

1953 American novels
American mystery novels
Random House books
Novels by Mignon G. Eberhart
Collins Crime Club books